SS Selah Chamberlain was a wooden hulled Great Lakes freighter that sank in Lake Michigan in 1886,  off the coast of Sheboygan, Sheboygan County, Wisconsin, United States after being rammed by the steamer John Pridgeon Jr. with the loss of five lives. On January 7, 2019, the wreck of Selah Chamberlain was listed on the National Register of Historic Places, and was given the reference number 100003288. She was the first shipwreck listed on the National Register of Historic Places in 2019.

Selah Chamberlain
Selah Chamberlain (May 4, 1812 – December 27, 1890) was a railroad developer involved in the iron industry and banking. He was born in Brattleboro, Vermont on May 4, 1812, to Selah and Abigail (née Burnett) Chamberlain. At the age of 21, he moved to Boston, Massachusetts where he obtained business training as an apprentice working in a grocery store. In 1835, Chamberlain formed his own company, and was contracted to build an extension to the Erie & Pennsylvania Canal. His company was later contracted to help build the Wabash & Erie Canal. In the 1840s, he supervised improvements to the St. Lawrence River. In 1844, Chamberlain married Arabella Cochran, and had two children named James and William. In 1847 he went back to Vermont to build pieces of a new railroad. Chamberlain was largely responsible for the construction of the Rutland & Burlington Railroad, and the Lake Champlain Railroad. In 1849, he moved to Cleveland, Ohio, and founded the Chamberlain, Gorham, & Perkins bank, which would merge into the Merchants National Bank in 1880. Also in 1849, he was contracted to build the Cleveland & Pittsburgh Railroad. In 1850, he was one of the co-founders of the Cleveland Iron Mining Company. Chamberlain died on December 27, 1890, and was buried in the Lake View Cemetery.

History

Construction

Selah Chamberlain (Official number 115147) was built in 1873 by Quayle & Martin shipyard of Cleveland, Ohio. She originally had a gross tonnage of 894.69 tons. Both the engine and the boilers were built by the Globe Iron Works Company of Cleveland, Ohio. She also had three masts and at the start of her career, a single deck. In her early career she was also classified as a steam barge. She was generally used to carry cargo such as iron ore, coal and grain between Duluth, Minnesota and Buffalo, New York. She often regularly towed a schooner barge. She was originally built for Alva Bradley of Cleveland, Ohio.

Service history
On May 11, 1873 while Selah Chamberlain was on her maiden voyage bound from Cleveland, Ohio for Escanaba, Michigan where she would load a cargo of iron ore, she ran aground on Bois Blanc Island while trying to negotiate the Straits of Mackinac. Fortunately, Selah Chamberlain received no major damage and was able to resume her journey the next day.

In 1874 she had a second deck added, increasing her cargo carrying capacity, and increasing her gross tonnage to 1207.01 tons and her net tonnage to 963.98 tons. 

In  May, 1881 Selah Chamberlain received repairs at the Globe Dry Docks at Cleveland, Ohio. In 1883 she was transferred to the Bradley Transportation Company. 

On November 15, 1883 Selah Chamberlain lost her main mast, and got her rigging entangled in her propeller on Lake Superior. In 1884 she was chartered to carry wheat from Duluth, Minnesota to Buffalo, New York for three runs. 

In October, 1884 while towing the schooner barge John Martin, Selah Chamberlain encountered a gale and was driven against the Canadian Pacific Railway coal docks in Port Arthur, Ontario, causing approximately $1,500 worth of damage to them. The Duluth News Tribune published the following article about the event:
Early Sunday morning the (steam) barge Chamberlain towing the schooner John Martin, arrived light to take out wheat. The wind was strong from the northeast, and as usual under such circumstances, a powerful current was running out of the canal. The barge entered all right, but the current caught the  schooner and through her upon the  bulkhead of the South pier. To prevent serious damage to the vessel, the tow line was cast off, and she swung around the pier and  down towards to the  beach on the South side. Both anchors were dropped, but the distance was so short and her momentum so great that they dragged and she went high  on the beach, after breaking down some of the trestle work leading to the lighthouse at the end of the pier. The tugs in the harbor were powerless to render any assistance until the sea went down. Yesterday the tugs Mollie Spencer, Nellie Cotton, and Brower, and the barges Chamberlain and E.B. Hale were busy in an effort to dredge and pull her off. It was not until the middle of the afternoon that they succeeded, and the Martin reached her dock. She is not damaged. In making for the Northern Pacific dock when she entered the harbor Sunday morning, the barge Chamberlain ran clear through the middle of the wagon bridge between that dock and the Northwest Coal docks. The bridge was impassible yesterday, but the barge was not injured.

In 1885 Selah Chamberlain received new upper decks and was re-caulked. She spent the entire year hauling iron ore and grain with the schooner barge John Martin and several other schooner barges.

Final voyage
On October 13, 1886, Selah Chamberlain and her schooner barge, Fayette Brown were bound from Milwaukee, Wisconsin to Escanaba, Michigan to load up a cargo of iron ore which they would then transport to Cleveland, Ohio. As they were sailing north, they encountered a dense fog. Captain A. Greenly immediately signaled her whistle once, and then steered her to port. However, the collision was unavoidable and Selah Chamberlain was struck in her port bow by the slightly larger, and newer John Pridgeon Jr. After the collision, the crew of Selah Chamberlain cut Fayette Brown loose, so if Selah Chamberlain sank, she wouldn't sink Fayette Brown as well. Selah Chamberlain sank approximately 15 minutes after the collision. Over the next few years, a number of unsuccessful operations to raise Selah Chamberlain were carried out.

Selah Chamberlain today
Her wreck is broken into three pieces. A lot of her lower hull remains on the site, and her fan tail stern is split, exposing her two boilers and her engine. Her wooden floors are reinforced with steel I-beams. Her tandem engine, and its decorated cast iron frame rise  from the bottom of the lake.

References

Maritime incidents in 1881
Maritime incidents in November 1883
Maritime incidents in October 1884
Maritime incidents in October 1886
Shipwrecks of Lake Michigan
Steamships of the United States
Great Lakes freighters
Merchant ships of the United States
1873 ships
Shipwrecks of the Wisconsin coast
Ships built in Cleveland
Shipwrecks on the National Register of Historic Places in Wisconsin
Wreck diving sites in the United States